Aschnaoonops is a genus of spiders in the family Oonopidae. It was first described in 2011 by Makhan & Ezzatpanah. , it contains 41 species.

Species
Aschnaoonops comprises the following species:
Aschnaoonops alban Platnick, Dupérré, Berniker & Bonaldo, 2013
Aschnaoonops aquada Platnick, Dupérré, Berniker & Bonaldo, 2013
Aschnaoonops aschnae Makhan & Ezzatpanah, 2011
Aschnaoonops belem Platnick, Dupérré, Berniker & Bonaldo, 2013
Aschnaoonops bocono Platnick, Dupérré, Berniker & Bonaldo, 2013
Aschnaoonops caninde Platnick, Dupérré, Berniker & Bonaldo, 2013
Aschnaoonops chingaza Platnick, Dupérré, Berniker & Bonaldo, 2013
Aschnaoonops chorro Platnick, Dupérré, Berniker & Bonaldo, 2013
Aschnaoonops cosanga Platnick, Dupérré, Berniker & Bonaldo, 2013
Aschnaoonops cristalina Platnick, Dupérré, Berniker & Bonaldo, 2013
Aschnaoonops gorda Platnick, Dupérré, Berniker & Bonaldo, 2013
Aschnaoonops huila Platnick, Dupérré, Berniker & Bonaldo, 2013
Aschnaoonops indio Platnick, Dupérré, Berniker & Bonaldo, 2013
Aschnaoonops jaji Platnick, Dupérré, Berniker & Bonaldo, 2013
Aschnaoonops jatun Platnick, Dupérré, Berniker & Bonaldo, 2013
Aschnaoonops leticia Platnick, Dupérré, Berniker & Bonaldo, 2013
Aschnaoonops malkini Platnick, Dupérré, Berniker & Bonaldo, 2013
Aschnaoonops margaretae Platnick, Dupérré, Berniker & Bonaldo, 2013
Aschnaoonops marshalli Platnick, Dupérré, Berniker & Bonaldo, 2013
Aschnaoonops marta Platnick, Dupérré, Berniker & Bonaldo, 2013
Aschnaoonops masneri Platnick, Dupérré, Berniker & Bonaldo, 2013
Aschnaoonops merida Platnick, Dupérré, Berniker & Bonaldo, 2013
Aschnaoonops meta Platnick, Dupérré, Berniker & Bonaldo, 2013
Aschnaoonops orito Platnick, Dupérré, Berniker & Bonaldo, 2013
Aschnaoonops paez Platnick, Dupérré, Berniker & Bonaldo, 2013
Aschnaoonops pamplona Platnick, Dupérré, Berniker & Bonaldo, 2013
Aschnaoonops pedro Platnick, Dupérré, Berniker & Bonaldo, 2013
Aschnaoonops pira Platnick, Dupérré, Berniker & Bonaldo, 2013
Aschnaoonops propinquus (Keyserling, 1881)
Aschnaoonops ramirezi Platnick, Dupérré, Berniker & Bonaldo, 2013
Aschnaoonops silvae Platnick, Dupérré, Berniker & Bonaldo, 2013
Aschnaoonops similis (Keyserling, 1881)
Aschnaoonops simla (Chickering, 1968)
Aschnaoonops simoni Platnick, Dupérré, Berniker & Bonaldo, 2013
Aschnaoonops tachira Platnick, Dupérré, Berniker & Bonaldo, 2013
Aschnaoonops tariba Platnick, Dupérré, Berniker & Bonaldo, 2013
Aschnaoonops teleferico Platnick, Dupérré, Berniker & Bonaldo, 2013
Aschnaoonops tiputini Platnick, Dupérré, Berniker & Bonaldo, 2013
Aschnaoonops trujillo Platnick, Dupérré, Berniker & Bonaldo, 2013
Aschnaoonops villalba Platnick, Dupérré, Berniker & Bonaldo, 2013
Aschnaoonops yasuni Platnick, Dupérré, Berniker & Bonaldo, 2013

References

Oonopidae
Araneomorphae genera
Spiders of the Caribbean
Spiders of South America